Sava Očinić was a Serbian Orthodox bishop, serving as the Metropolitan of Cetinje from 1694 to 1697. He was born in Očinići, a small village near Cetinje. He succeeded Visarion Borilović (s. 1685–1692). Sava was ordinated a bishop in November 1694 by Hadži-Simeon (the Metropolitan of Belgrade), Savatije Ljubibratić (the Metropolitan of Zahumlje) and Gerasim (the Metropolitan of Herzegovina) in Herceg Novi. Due to the destruction of the Old Cetinje Monastery by the forces of Süleyman Bushati in 1692 he lived in the Dobrska Ćelija monastery in Dobrsko Selo, where the seat of the Metropolitanate was temporary moved. He was succeeded by Danilo Šćepčević.

References

Sources
 
 

1697 deaths
17th-century births
17th-century Eastern Orthodox bishops
Bishops of Montenegro and the Littoral
Clergy from Cetinje
Date of birth unknown
Ottoman period in the history of Montenegro
Serbian Orthodox metropolitans of Montenegro